Borkung Hrangkhawl, also known as B.K., is a Tripuri rapper, singer and songwriter from Tripura.  He won a VIMA Asia Award and is well known in Northeast India.
He is the son of Tripura politician Bijoy Kumar Hrangkhawl.

Discography

Singles 
The Roots, Chini Haa (2012)

The Journey (2013)

Never Give Up (2014)

Hashtag I Wanna Be Famous (2015)

Fighter (2016)

OPPOSITE (2020)

FAX (2020)

Collaborative Songs 
Fighter ft. Meyi  (2016)

BK & INA - Free (2013)

8 ft. Moko Koza (2021)

Other Appearances 
Hrangkhwal also made an appearance at TEDxYouth@RonaldsayRoad, the first-ever TEDx event in the easternmost state of India. On the 20th of November 2021 made a Talk about self-promotion and belief and spoke on how to make your own path and scale new heights. Also speaking at the event were local celebrities and activists.

References 

Indian rappers
Indian male singers
Indian male songwriters
1987 births
Living people